Derwent Valley may refer to:

United Kingdom
The valley of the River Derwent, Derbyshire, also:
Upper Derwent Valley in Derbyshire
Derwent Valley Mills a historic factory site.
Derwent Valley Line a railway line
Derwent Valley Heritage Way
Derwent Valley Water Board
The valley of the River Derwent, North East England, on the border between County Durham and Northumberland
Derwent Valley Railway (County Durham)
The valley of the River Derwent, Cumbria in the Lake District 
The valley of the River Derwent, Yorkshire in Yorkshire 
Derwent Valley Light Railway a light railway.
Derwent Valley Productions a media company.

Tasmania, Australia
Derwent Valley Council, a local government area in Tasmania
Derwent Valley Railway (Tasmania), a heritage railway in Tasmania

See also
River Derwent (disambiguation)
Derwent Valley Railway (disambiguation)